Diana Dimova (born 7 August 1984) is a Bulgarian badminton player. At the Bulgarian National Badminton Championships she won 13 titles in women's doubles and mixed doubles events.

Achievements

BWF International Challenge/Series 
Women's singles

Women's doubles

Mixed doubles

  BWF International Challenge tournament
  BWF International Series tournament
  BWF Future Series tournament

References

External links 
 
 

1984 births
Living people
Bulgarian female badminton players